Plasmodium alloelongatum is a parasite of the genus Plasmodium.

Like all Plasmodium species P. alloelongatum has both vertebrate and insect hosts. The vertebrate hosts for this parasite are birds.

Description
The parasite was first described by Paperna et al. in 2007.

Geographical occurrence
This parasite is found in Israel.

Clinical features and host pathology
P. alloelongatum infects the Levant sparrowhawk (Accipiter brevipes).

References

alloelongatum